Hearse is a Swedish melodic death metal band formed by vocalist Johan Liiva (ex-Arch Enemy) and drummer Max Thornell in 2001. The band have released five albums to date.

History 
Following Johan Liiva's departure from NonExist, he decided to team up with one time Furbowl bandmate Max Thornell to form a new project. The duo soon recruited guitarist Mattias Ljung, who had not actually played any metal for several years, and recorded a demo in 2001. The band's first recording was sent to select metal press and labels, and attracted interest from Hammerheart Records. After signing a contract, the first single Torch was released in 2002, and the debut album Dominion Reptilian followed in March 2003. In the summer of 2003 Hearse started recording their second album titled Armageddon, Mon Amour. It was finally released in April 2004 on Karmageddon Media (formerly Hammerheart Records). Their third album, The Last Ordeal, was released in 2005, and their fourth release, In These Veins, was released in 2006 on Cold Records. In 2009, Hearse released their fifth album, Single Ticket To Paradise. A music video for the song "Sundown" was produced.

Discography

Full-length 
 Dominion Reptilian (2003)
 Armageddon, Mon Amour (2004)
 The Last Ordeal (2005)
 In These Veins (2006)
 Single Ticket to Paradise (2009)

Demos 
 Hearse (2002)

EPs 
 Torch (2002)
 Cambodia (2005)

Members

Current members 
 Johan Liiva – vocals
 Max Thornell – drums
 Mattias Ljung – guitars
 Jocke "Skägget" Knutsson – bass (sessional/live member)

See also 
 Arch Enemy
 Johan Liiva

External links 

Swedish melodic death metal musical groups
Musical groups established in 2001